Home is an album by David Murray released in 1982 on the Italian Black Saint label and the second to feature his Octet. It features performances by Murray, Henry Threadgill, Olu Dara, Lawrence "Butch" Morris, George E. Lewis, Anthony Davis, Wilbur Morris and Steve McCall.

Reception

The Rolling Stone Jazz Record Guide said, "both Ming and Home display an excellent balance between written material and solos by a distinguished group of sidemen".

The Penguin Guide to Jazz selected this album, along with its predecessor Ming, as part of its suggested Core Collection.

The Allmusic review by Scott Yanow awarded the album 4½ stars, stating, "All of the brilliant players have their opportunities to make strong contributions to Murray's five originals (best known of which is "3-D Family"), and the leader's writing is consistently colorful and unpredictable. Recommended.".

Track listing
 "Home" – 5:58  
 "Santa Barbara and Crenshaw Follies" – 7:30  
 "Choctaw Blues" – 7:20  
 "Last of the Hipmen" – 9:12  
 "3-D Family" – 8:35  
 
All compositions by David Murray
Recorded at Right Track Recording Studios, NYC, October 31 & November 1, 1981

Personnel
David Murray – tenor saxophone, bass clarinet
Henry Threadgill – alto saxophone, flute, alto flute
Olu Dara – trumpet
Lawrence "Butch" Morris – cornet
George E. Lewis – trombone
Anthony Davis – piano
Wilber Morris – bass
Steve McCall – drums

References

1982 albums
David Murray (saxophonist) albums
Black Saint/Soul Note albums